Anatoliy Oprya (born 25 November 1977) is a professional Ukrainian football midfielder who plays for FC Balkany Zorya.

Career
Anatoliy Oprya started his career in Ukrainian club FC Portovyk Illychivsk; later played in the Russian League with lower-level clubs Sochi and Kristall Smolensk until spotted by Rubin Kazan. He joined Kryvbas during the summer 2007 transfer season from FC Kharkiv.

In the Ukrainian Premier League, Oprya played for Chornomorets Odesa and FC Kharkiv before moving to Kryvbas in July 2007. As of 1 January 2008, Anatoliy Oprya played 117 games and scored 6 goals in the Ukrainian Premier League.

References

External links
 
 Official Website Profile
 Profile on Football Squads

1977 births
People from Chornomorsk
Living people
Ukrainian footballers
Ukrainian expatriate footballers
FC Portovyk Illichivsk players
FC CSKA Kyiv players
FC Zhemchuzhina Sochi players
FC Kristall Smolensk players
FC Rubin Kazan players
FC Chornomorets Odesa players
FC Chornomorets-2 Odesa players
FC Kryvbas Kryvyi Rih players
FC Metalist Kharkiv players
FC Kharkiv players
FC Dnister Ovidiopol players
Expatriate footballers in Russia
Ukrainian expatriate sportspeople in Russia
Russian Premier League players
Ukrainian Premier League players
Association football midfielders
FC Balkany Zorya players
Ukrainian First League players
Sportspeople from Odesa Oblast